Pucking is a small town in the Linz-Land district in the Austrian state of Upper Austria.

Geography
Pucking lies in central Upper Austria. About 19 percent of the municipality is forest, and 62 percent is farmland.

References 

Cities and towns in Linz-Land District